Fraser Ministry may refer to:

 First Deakin Ministry
 Second Deakin Ministry
 Third Deakin Ministry